The 2019 Asian Men's U23 Volleyball Championship is the third edition of the Asian Men's U23 Volleyball Championship, a biennial international volleyball tournament organised by the Asian Volleyball Confederation (AVC) with Myanmar Volleyball Association. It is held in Naypyitaw, Myanmar from 3 to 11 August 2019.

Participated teams

Pools composition
Teams were seeded in the first two positions of each pool following the Serpentine system according to their final standing of the 2017 edition. All teams not seeded were drawn. Final standing of the 2017 edition are shown in brackets except the host.

Venues
 Wunna Theikdi Sports Complex – Hall B, Naypyidaw, Myanmar – Pool A, B and Final eight
 Wunna Theikdi Sports Complex – Hall C, Naypyidaw, Myanmar – Pool C, D and 9th–16th places

Pool standing procedure
 Numbers of matches won
 Match points
 Sets ratio
 Points ratio
 Result of the last match between the tied teams

Match won 3–0 or 2–1: 3 match points for the winner, 0 match points for the loser
Match won 3–2: 2 match points for the winner, 1 match point for the loser

Preliminary round
All times are Myanmar Daylight Time (UTC+06:00).

Pool A

|}

|}

Pool B

|}

|}

Pool C

|}

|}

Pool D

|}

|}

Second round
All times are Myanmar Daylight Time (UTC+06:00).
The results and the points of the matches between the same teams that were already played during the preliminary round shall be taken into account for the classification round.

Pool E

|}

|}

Pool F

|}

|}

Pool G

|}

|}

Pool H

|}

|}

Classification round
All times are Myanmar Daylight Time (UTC+06:00).

Bracket

13th place play-offs

|}

15th place match

|}

13th place match

|}

Bracket

9th place play-offs

|}

11th place match

|}

9th place match

|}

Final round
All times are Myanmar Daylight Time (UTC+06:00).

Bracket

Quarter-finals

|}

5th place play-offs

|}

7th place match

|}

5th place match

|}

Semi-finals

|}

3rd place match

|}

Final

|}

Final standing

Awards

Most Valuable Player
 Chan Min-han
Best Setter
 Appavu Muyhudsmy
Best Outside Spikers
 Ali Usman Faryad
 Arai Yudai

Best Middle Blockers
 Murayama Go
 Prince
Best Opposite Spiker
 Chang Yu-sheng
Best Libero
 Jhang Yun-liang

See also
 2019 Asian Women's U23 Volleyball Championship

References

External links
Official website
Regulations
Squads

Asian men's volleyball championships
2019 in volleyball